Distant Light may refer to:

Distant Light (Alex Lloyd album), 2003
Distant Light (The Hollies album), 1971
Distant Light, album by Renée Fleming 2017
Distant Light, violin concerto by Peteris Vasks

See also
 Distant Lights (disambiguation)